La Dorada is a town and municipality in the Colombian Department of Caldas.  It is the seat of the Roman Catholic Diocese of La Dorada–Guaduas. It is situated on the banks of Colombia's principal river, the Magdalena.

The city's economy is based primarily on livestock, fishing, and tourism.

Gallery

References

Municipalities of Caldas Department